Defensor Arica was a Peruvian football club based in Breña, Lima. The club was founded in 1929 and reached the Peruvian Second Division in 1947. They were subsequently promoted to the first division in 1964. Their greatest achievement was second place in the national league in 1969 and consequently in 1970 they played in the Copa Libertadores. Two years later Defensor Arica were relegated.

Honours

National
Peruvian Primera División:
Runner-up (1): 1969

Peruvian Segunda División:
Winners (1): 1964

Regional
Liga Regional de Lima y Callao:
Winners (1): 1947

Performance in CONMEBOL competitions
Copa Libertadores: 1 appearances
1970: First Round

Group 4

See also
List of football clubs in Peru
Peruvian football league system

External links
 RSSSF - Peru - List of Champions
 RSSSF - Peruvian football seasons

Football clubs in Peru
Association football clubs established in 1929